Beecher is an unincorporated community in Marinette County, Wisconsin (USA), in the town of Beecher. It is located on U.S. Highway 141.

Images

References

Unincorporated communities in Marinette County, Wisconsin
Unincorporated communities in Wisconsin